This is the list of English College Johore Bahru alumni.

Politics

Tun Hussein Onn - 3rd Prime Minister of Malaysia
Tun Musa Hitam - 5th Deputy Prime Minister of Malaysia
Tun Dr Ismail Abdul Rahman - 2nd Deputy Prime Minister of Malaysia
Dato' Syed Esa bin Alwee - the second Speaker of the Dewan Rakyat
Datuk Mohamed Rahmat - Former Pulai Parliament of United Malays National Organisation
Lee San Choon - 4th President of Malaysian Chinese Association
Lim Kit Siang - 2nd President of Democratic Action Party
Ungku Abdul Aziz Abdul Majid - 6th Menteri Besar of Johor
Dato' Wan Idris Ibrahim - 9th Menteri Besar of Johor
Datuk Seri Mohamed Khaled Nordin - 15th Menteri Besar of Johor
Tan Sri Samsudin Osman - Former Chief Secretary of Malaysia
J. B. Jeyaretnam - 3rd President of Workers' Party of Singapore
Tengku Haron Aminurrashid - Kempas State Assembly of United Malays National Organisation
Syed Hussein Alatas - Founding Members of Parti Gerakan Rakyat Malaysia and Vice Chancellor of University Malaya
Chua Jui Meng - The former and longest-serving Minister of Health Malaysia
Tun Awang Hassan - 5th Yang di-Pertua Negeri of Penang
Dato Razali Ibrahim - Muar Parliament of United Malay National Organisation
Dato Seri Ali Haji Ahmad - Former Minister of Agriculture Malaysia
Sheikh Ahmad Nafiq AlFirdaous - Former Councillor of Johor Bahru City Council
Syed Saddiq Abdul Rahman - Former Minister of Youth and Sports
YB Dr Maszlee Malik - Former Minister of Education Malaysia

Arts

Ahmad Zakii Anwar - A well-known artist in Malaysia
Datuk Sheikh Abdullah Ahmad - A World Famous Singer
Rozman Shafie (LY) - Composer with Two Times TV3 Anugerah Juara Lagu Winner
Mohd Faizal bin Maas (Ajai) - Malaysian Composer and Three Times Winner of National Music Industry Awards
Rahmad bin Tohak (Rahmat Mega) - Malaysian Rockstar Singer
Shah Nizam Abdul Halim (Shah Slam) -Malaysian top guitarist
Musa bin Radhi (Musrad) - Lyric and composer
Muhammad Azmir Selamat (AG Kool FM) - TV and Radio celebrity

Sports

Rezal Zambery Yahya - ATM FA player
Haji Abdullah bin Mohd Don, Harimau Malaya - Football Association of Johor player
Nafeez Wahab - FIFA Referee
Jasazrin Jamaluddin - Johor Darul Takzim FC midfield player
Shukri Abd Kadir - National hurdles coach
Dr Freddie Lai Kwok - President of the Johor Rugby Union
Hassan Yaakob - National Ruggers
Abu Bakar Yunos - National Ruggers
Ahmad Isa - National Ruggers
Wan Abdul Rahman - National Ruggers
Ungku Ibrahim - National Ruggers
Ungku Ismail Abdullah - National Ruggers
Ng Yew Liang - National Ruggers
Ng Yew Meng - National Ruggers
Dr Tay Chong Yew - National Cricket Player and Johore Ruggers
Hassan Yaakob - National Ruggers
Kenny Pestana - Johore Ruggers
Brian Pestana - Johore Ruggers
Abdullah Ali - Johore Ruggers
Daniel Nathaniel - Johore Ruggers
Jagjit Singh - Johore Ruggers
Zubir Ali - Johore Ruggers
Abdul Majid Tahir - Johore Ruggers
N. Selvarajah - Johore Ruggers
Tom Alkhafidz - National Ruggers

Education

Professor Diraja Ungku Abdul Aziz Ungku Abdul Hamid - First Regius Professor in Malaysia
Hj. Samsudin Bin Md Ariff - 43rd headmaster of English College Johore Bahru
Tan Sri Kuek Ho Yao - A renowned figure in Johor's development and a founder of Southern University College, brother of Robert Kuok
Tun Zaki Azmi - 6th Chief Justice of Malaysia and Chancellor Multimedia University
YH Professor Dato' Dr Daing Mohd Nasir Ibrahim - Vice Chancellor of Universiti Malaysia Pahang
Adibah Amin - 1st Headmistress of Sekolah Seri Puteri
Syed Muhammad Naquib al-Attas - prominent contemporary Muslim philosopher and thinker
 Dr Keong Choong - PhD from Imperial College London, academician, finance & investment consultant
 Prof. Dato' Dr. Ho Sinn Chye - PhD from Max Planck Institute and Kiel University Germany, Vice-Chancellor of Wawasan Open University

Royalty

Iskandar of Johor - 24th Sultan of Johor, the eighth Yang di-Pertuan Agong of Malaysia
Ibrahim Ismail of Johor - 25th Sultan of Johor
Tunku Abdul Majid - Tunku Bendahara of Johor
Tunku Maimunah Ismailiah
Tunku Masera
Tunku Mariam

Military

General Tun Ibrahim Ismail - 3rd commander of the Malaysian Armed Forces
General Tun Ghazali Mohd Seth - 4th commander of the Malaysian Armed Forces 
First Admiral Dato' Ir Hj Ahmad Murad Hj Omar - Royal Malaysian Navy

Business

Robert Kuok - 40th richest man in the world
Tan Sri Jamaluddin Ibrahim - CEO and president of Axiata Group
Tan Sri Muhammad Ali Hashim - President of DPIM and former CEO of Johor Corporation
Dato Abdul Wahid Omar - Former Chairman of Pemodalan Nasional Berhad
Dato'Hj Mohd Razip Hj Mohammad - Executive Director of TH Heavy Industries Sdn Bhd

Others

 Tan Sri Taib Andak, chairman of Majlis Amanah Rakyat and Federal Land Development Authority
Tun Zaki bin Tun Azmi - The sixth Chief Justice of Malaysia
Tan Sri Dato' Hj.Ahmad Perang - 1st Malay General Manager of Malayan Railway (KTM)
Micheal Graham Parry - 15th Grand Master of Freemason Johor Royal Lodge
Dr.Zubaidi Hj.Ahmad - Malaysian Bloggers Doctor
M. G. G. Pillai - A Malaysian journalist and political activist
Datin Paduka Dr. Hajah Sharifah Mazlina - the first Asian woman to travel to the North Pole
Mohamed Hamzah - creator of Malaysian flag
Dr. Teo Kah Wee - Pediatrician/Influencer

References

Lists of people by school affiliation
Lists of Malaysian people
People by educational institution in Malaysia